Ferhat Kaya (born 11 March 1986) is a Belgian professional footballer of Kurdish descent who plays as a goalkeeper for Belgian Division 3 club Beringen.

Career
Kaya was born in Beringen, Belgian Limburg, and started playing football at the Westerlo youth academy. Via Verbroedering Geel, he moved to the PSV Eindhoven academy in 2003. After having played there for two years, Kaya left for Turkish club Gaziantepspor.

In August 2008, after three years in Turkey, Kaya signed with Eerste Divisie club FC Eindhoven after a successful trial. A year later, he signed with Racing Mol-Wezel in the Belgian Third Division. Afterwards, he had stints with FC Brussels and Royal Antwerp.

Kaya then trained for six months with SV Meerssen, before signing a contract with Fortuna Sittard, who was looking for a successor to Danny Wintjens, who had moved to PEC Zwolle. Kaya became the starting goalkeeper at the club, andafter 144 matches, Kaya signed a two-year contract with Helmond Sport in June 2016.

He was signed by Sakaryaspor in the summer of 2017 on a free transfer. In April 2019, Kaya terminated his contract by mutual consent, after he had not received his salary.

In March 2021, after being a free agent for two years, Kaya joined Belgian Division 3 club Beringen.

References

External links
 Voetbal International profile 
 
 Ferhat Kaya at sport.de

1986 births
Living people
Belgian footballers
Gaziantep F.K. footballers
FC Eindhoven players
R.W.D.M. Brussels F.C. players
Royal Antwerp F.C. players
Fortuna Sittard players
Helmond Sport players
Sakaryaspor footballers
Eerste Divisie players
TFF Second League players
Belgian people of Turkish descent
People from Beringen, Belgium
Association football goalkeepers
Footballers from Limburg (Belgium)